Geri-Lynn Ramsay (born October 26, 1988 in Summerside, Prince Edward Island) is a Canadian curler from Calgary, Alberta. A native of the town of Summerside, Ramsay entered the national scene in 2010 after forming a rink with longtime junior teammate Erin Carmody and veteran curlers Kathy O'Rourke and Tricia Affleck that captured the 2010 provincial championships at the senior level. At the 2010 Scotties Tournament of Hearts, the squad made it all the way to the final, but lost in the last match to three-time tournament champion Jennifer Jones.

Career

2007–2009
In 2007 when her rink, consisting of Erin Carmody as skip, herself as third, Lisa Moerike as second and Jessica van Ouwerkerk as lead stone, captured the 2007 provincial junior curling championships with a perfect 7–0 record. They then advanced to the 2007 Canadian Junior Curling Championships, where they finished eighth out of thirteen teams. The squad took the provincial junior championships for a second time in 2008 and repeated their feat of a perfect record, before placing ninth out of thirteen at the 2008 Canadian Junior Curling Championships. Later that year the rink took the 2008 Codiac Curling Maritime Junior Bonspiel in the Under-21 category. In 2009 Moerike was replaced with Darcee Birch, and the team won the provincial junior championship for the third consecutive time. The squad had their best national finish at the 2009 Canadian Junior Curling Championships when they placed fourth, narrowly missing a spot in the semifinals.

2009–2011
In 2009 Carmody and Ramsay received a call from veteran curlers Kathy O'Rourke and Tricia Affleck, who decided to join forces with the younger players under a team skipped by O'Rourke, but with Carmody throwing the skip rocks and O'Rourke throwing second. Ramsay would throw third and Affleck would take the lead position. The squad found quick success by winning the 2010 Prince Edward Island Scotties Tournament of Hearts, which earned them the right to represent Prince Edward Island at the 2010 Scotties Tournament of Hearts. There they finished 8–3 in the round robin and eventually advanced to the final, where they lost against Jennifer Jones, who represented Team Canada as the competition's previous winner.

2011–2012
For the 2011-2012 curling season Ramsay, along with Erin Carmody, played with Calgary skip Crystal Webster. Webster was looking for new teammates, as her third Lori Olson-Johns switched rinks to curl with Cheryl Bernard, and during the 2011 Scotties Tournament of Hearts, while sitting as an alternate for Shannon Kleibrink, asked Ramsay and Carmody to join her squad.

Personal life
Ramsay works as a server for Vintage Chophouse.

References

External links

1988 births
Curlers from Prince Edward Island
Living people
People from Summerside, Prince Edward Island
Curlers from Calgary
Canadian women curlers
Canada Cup (curling) participants